Behre is a surname. Notable people with the surname include:

 David Behre (born 1986), German Paralympic sprint runner
 Frederick Behre (1863–1942), American artist
 Wilfried Behre (born 1956), German artist and sculptor

See also
 Behr
 Bere (surname)